Chauny station (French: Gare de Chauny) is a railway station serving the town Chauny, Aisne department, northern France. It is situated on the Creil–Jeumont railway.

Services

The station is served by regional trains to Compiègne, Saint-Quentin and Paris.

See also 

 List of SNCF stations in Hauts-de-France

References

Railway stations in Aisne
Railway stations in France opened in 1849